Church of the Redeemer is a historic Episcopal church located in Asheville, Buncombe County, North Carolina. It was built in 1886–1888, and is a native stone cruciform chapel in the Romanesque style.  It measures 50 feet long and has a steeply pitched slate gable roof. It features stained glass in round-arch windows—including a Tiffany window signed by Louis Comfort Tiffany. Also on the property is a contributing cemetery. It was built by Dr. Francis Willis, a British physician, who built the private chapel on his 100-acre estate.

It was listed on the National Register of Historic Places in 1985.

References

19th-century Episcopal church buildings
Episcopal church buildings in North Carolina
Churches on the National Register of Historic Places in North Carolina
Romanesque Revival church buildings in North Carolina
Churches completed in 1888
Churches in Asheville, North Carolina
National Register of Historic Places in Buncombe County, North Carolina